Agostino Maria Salvago, O.P. (died 1567) was a Roman Catholic prelate who served as Archbishop of Genoa (1559–1567) and Bishop of Accia (1553–1558).

Biography
Agostino Maria Salvago was ordained a priest in the Order of Preachers.
On 18 August 1553, he was appointed during the papacy of Pope Julius III as Bishop of Accia; he resigned on 28 November 1558.
On 17 April 1559, he was appointed during the papacy of Pope Paul IV as Archbishop of Genoa.
He served as Archbishop of Genoa until his death on 30 September 1567.

While bishop, he was the principal consecrator of Cherubino Lavosio, Bishop of Telese o Cerreto Sannita (1566)

References

External links and additional sources
 (for Chronology of Bishops) 
 (for Chronology of Bishops) 
 (for Chronology of Bishops) 
 (for Chronology of Bishops) 

16th-century Italian Roman Catholic bishops
Bishops appointed by Pope Julius III
Bishops appointed by Pope Paul IV
1567 deaths
Dominican bishops
16th-century Italian Roman Catholic archbishops
Roman Catholic archbishops of Genoa